Scopula uvarovi is a moth of the family Geometridae. It is found in Oman.

References

Moths described in 1952
uvarovi
Moths of Asia